St. Nicholas' Church is a church in Shelcan, Elbasan County, Albania. Its interior is completely covered with frescoes by Onufri. It became a Cultural Monument of Albania in 1948.

References

Cultural Monuments of Albania
Buildings and structures in Elbasan
Churches in Albania